Panagia-Katakekrymeni-Portokalousa Argous (Greek Παναγία Κατακεκρυμμένη – Πορτοκαλούσα Άργους) is a former monastery and church in Argos on the slopes of Mount Larissa, roughly translating to "Our Hidden Lady the Orange-Bearer of Argos." Its official title is the Monastery of the Entry of the Most Holy Theotokos into the Temple, but it derives its popular name from the secreting of an ancient icon of Panagia (Virgin Mary) in a cave below the church, hidden by the branches of orange trees.

The icon was hidden due to concerns for its safety during a Turkish military action in 1803 by Ottoman forces based in Tripoli. According to tradition, when the monks went to retrieve the icon, a second traditional icon thought lost had miraculously appeared next to the one that was hidden. These "lost" or "hidden" icons are now "found," and on display in the chapel. The Marian icons are in the glykophiloussa ("sweetly-kissing") style, which depict Mary kissing the baby Jesus. On feast days, they are carried in procession decorated with local oranges.

The events in Tripoli were connected to the history of Saint Demetrius the Neomartyr of the Peloponnese, a Greek Orthodox Christian boy born in Floka and raised in Ligouditsa, both in Arcadia, near Tripoli. He converted to Islam as a boy, but later repented and became an Orthodox monk. Demetrius decided that to expiate his sins, he must perform a great penance by returning to Tripoli to confess publicly that he was recanting his conversion to Islam. His abbot tried to dissuade him, to no avail, and Demetrius returned to Tripoli and publicly confessed his re-conversion to Christianity. Because of this, he was tried by a Turkish judge for apostasy from Islam and convicted and sentenced to die in 1803, despite the attempted intercession of a Turkish friend, who tried to cover up for him. Thus, in addition to celebrating the icons of the Panagia, the church at the former monastery is also used for an annual commemoration of Demetrius.

The monastery was founded in the 18th century as a Greek Orthodox nunnery, and became the site of a secret Greek school under the Ottoman occupation of Greece. During the Greek war of Independence, it was used as the first national mint of Greece to strike coinage for the Greek government. It became a male monastery in 1856, and the surrounding land became a glebe for the monks.

From 1911–1976, under the administrations of Hieromonks Joseph and Makarios Drosos, the chapel was re-dedicated in honor of Saint John the Baptist, (called "The Forerunner" in Greek), because Saint Demetrius the Neomartyr had become a monk at a monastery dedicated to Saint John on the island of Chios before returning to Tripoli. While the monastery buildings are still intact, local monks now reside at other monasteries in the area and act as caretakers for the site.

External links

 Portokalousa blog 

 
Christian monasteries in Greece
Greek Orthodox monasteries